Clinton Amos Clauson (March 28, 1895 – December 30, 1959) was a Democratic Party politician and the 66th Governor of Maine. Clauson died while in office, having served as governor for just under a year.

Life and career
Clauson grew up in Iowa and served in World War I in early adulthood. He later became a member of many organizations including Freemasonry, the Independent Order of Odd Fellows, and the Newcomen Society of the United States. In 1919 he graduated from the Palmer College of Chiropractic and later set up a practice in Waterville, Maine. He entered politics in 1928 as a member of the Democratic State Committee. After that he rose in Waterville's politics and in 1956 became mayor. He served for a year as mayor before being elected Governor.

As a politician, he was deemed to be a conservative Democrat. His election victory surprised many in Maine, as Edmund Muskie's favorite had been expected to win and the Republican challenger was the better known Horace A. Hildreth. In an obituary, Clauson's career had been termed "unorthodox". Clauson immigrated to Maine from Iowa as a young man, rose from obscurity to win the 1958 Democratic gubernatorial nomination as a conservative Democrat over the favorite of Maine liberals led by Governor Edmund Muskie, and went on to defeat a Republican opponent who was a heavy favorite.

Some accomplishments during his brief term included expanding Maine's sales tax to fund the formation of consolidated school districts, instituting a 3% lodging tax for school funding, the first open meetings law in Maine, and expanding the powers of judges in state municipal courts, which led to the formation of the District Court system two years after his death.

Death
Clauson died in his sleep on December 30, 1959, before he could finish out his term, although no cause of death was given. He is buried in Pine Grove Cemetery. Clauson was succeeded by the President of the Maine Senate, John H. Reed. Reed, a Republican, was subsequently elected governor after a special election.

In 1961, the Maine Legislature voted to name two bridges over the Kennebec River in Fairfield on the then-under construction Interstate 95 the Clinton A. Clauson Memorial Bridges. The bridges were completed in 1964 and rehabilitated from 2013 to 2014.

References

External links

1895 births
1959 deaths
American chiropractors
People from Mitchell County, Iowa
Mayors of Waterville, Maine
Democratic Party governors of Maine
20th-century American politicians